Sergei Borisovich Novikov (born 13 June 1961) is a retired Soviet and Russian professional football player.

Honours
 Soviet Top League champion: 1987, 1989.
 Soviet Top League runner-up: 1985.
 Soviet Top League bronze: 1986.
 USSR Federation Cup winner: 1987.

European club competitions
With FC Spartak Moscow.

 1985–86 UEFA Cup: 6 games, 1 goals.
 1986–87 UEFA Cup: 3 games, 2 goals.
 1987–88 UEFA Cup: 1 game.

External links
 

1961 births
Living people
Soviet footballers
Russian footballers
Russian expatriate footballers
Expatriate footballers in Bangladesh
FC Spartak Moscow players
FC Asmaral Moscow players
Russian expatriate sportspeople in Bangladesh
Soviet Top League players
Association football midfielders
FC Iskra Smolensk players
1. FC Neubrandenburg 04 players